The Poet Laureate of North Dakota is the poet laureate for the U.S. state of North Dakota.

List of Poets Laureate
 Corbin A. Waldron (1957-1978)
 Henry R. Martinson (1979-1981)
 Lydia O. Jackson (1979-1984)
 Larry Woiwode (1995-2022)

External links
Poets Laureate of North Dakota at the Library of Congress

See also

 Poet laureate
 List of U.S. states' poets laureate
 United States Poet Laureate

References

 
North Dakota culture
American Poets Laureate